North Lathrop station is a planned Altamont Corridor Express station in Lathrop, California – the second to be constructed in the city. It was expected to open to revenue service in 2023 as part of the first phase of ACE's expansion to Merced, but was later delayed to 2027.

The station is located on a segment of the former Sharpe Army Depot. Whereas the original Lathrop/Manteca station was sited as a compromise to draw commuters from both cities, this station is located closer to residential areas.

North Lathrop is designed as a transfer station to allow passengers from San Joaquin Valley shuttle trains to transfer to services bound for San Jose. The station is also planned to serve as the first phase northern terminus of Valley Link, a project by the Tri-Valley-San Joaquin Valley Regional Rail Authority to build a rail connection to Bay Area Rapid Transit's Dublin/Pleasanton station. Up to 3,500 parking spaces may be built to accommodate future park and ride demand by 2040.

References

Lathrop, California
Future Altamont Corridor Express stations
Altamont Corridor Express stations in San Joaquin County, California
Railway stations scheduled to open in 2027
Future Valley Link stations